Solfrid Annette Andersen Dahle (born 13 May 1982) is a Norwegian football striker who mostly played for Trondheims-Ørn of the Norwegian Toppserien league. Before the 2008 season she became a central defender and took over as the team captain. She was capped for Norway as a striker in 2006 and has later played for the national team as a central defender.

References

External links
Profile at club site

1982 births
Living people
People from Karmøy
Norwegian women's footballers
Norway women's youth international footballers
Norway women's international footballers
SK Trondheims-Ørn players
VCU Rams women's soccer players
Toppserien players
Virginia Commonwealth University alumni
Norwegian expatriate footballers
Norwegian expatriate sportspeople in the United States
Expatriate women's soccer players in the United States
Women's association football forwards
Sportspeople from Rogaland